Pagans may refer to:

 Paganism, a group of pre-Christian religions practiced in the Roman Empire 
 Modern Paganism, a group of contemporary religious practices 
 Order of the Vine, a druidic faction in the Thief video game series
 Pagan's Motorcycle Club, a motorcycle club
 The Pagans, a 1970s American punk band
 The Pagans (film), a 1953 Italian film

See also
Pagan (disambiguation)